Gerald Summers (1899–1967) was a British mid-century modern furniture designer. He came to prominence with his design for the Bent Plywood Armchair. Another of his noted works was the Two-Tier Table. Both pieces were designed in 1934 and manufactured by Makers of Simple Furniture, the firm he founded.

Life
Summers was born in Alexandria, Egypt in 1899, the youngest of six children. He attended Eltham College located in the south eastern part of London. He concentrated on principles of Christianity as well as carpentry. One of his classes included instruction in furniture design where he shone as a student.

In 1915, Summers left school at the age of 16 with no plans. An apprenticeship through a family friend who practiced at the Ruston Engineering Firm followed, but his experience was cut short when he joined the army during the World War I. He returned home from the war and married Marjorie Butcher. She became his partner and as a gift to her, Summers made her an elegant table. This table was the introduction to his design career.

Summers was interested in making simple furniture with his wife as his partner in 1929. He embraced the contemporary style and pushed its boundaries. He later had the opportunity to hold his own exhibition at the Fortnum & Mason department store in London. Also participating in the exhibitions was another famous maker of a plywood armchair, Alvar Aalto.

With the positive response at the exhibition, Summers began to specialize in malleable and free-form designs. He first designed an airplane plywood which sparked the beginning of the most creative and innovative designs. He became known for his Bent Plywood Armchair, which showed off his ability of folding, bending and molding wood to achieve high standards of flexibility. Summers had the ability to transform a given wood material into a diverse, different and seamless piece of furniture with a glossy surface, combined with the modernistic touch on life.

During World War II, Summers' firm closed. Summers died in 1967, at the age of 68, but the impact left by his work is still evident. Summers' furniture is widely appreciated in the current architectural and design world. He is still celebrated as an icon of impressive furniture designs and his pieces are prized by museums and collectors alike.

Bent Plywood Armchair

Summers' organically shaped armchair, comfortable even without cushions, involved low material and labour inputs. It was constructed from a single sheet of plywood. With its smooth surface and lack of metal connectors, it is hygienic and deteriorates only gradually. Its unusual shape probably stems from Alvar Aalto's furniture, especially the spectacular “Paimio” chair, which was shown in London in 1933. In his own company, Makers of Simple Furniture, Ltd., founded in 1929, Summers produced only 120 units of the chair. Despite the constructive advantages, the production costs of the chair and thus the sales price were higher than the popular Scandinavian designs. It was certainly also a disadvantage that the back legs could not withstand great stress and snapped easily.

Two Tier Table

This item was an occasional table designed in 1934 by Gerald Summers and made by 'Makers of Simple Furniture', a small British company producing furniture mainly to order. The item was a simple drum style table made of birch plywood. It is considered a rare and very collectible piece of British modernism, with birch plywood drum and top.

References

Bibliography
Reeves, Paul. The Best of British: Design from the 19th and 20th Centuries. London: Sotheby's, 2008.
Deese, Martha Hart. Gerald Summers and Makers of Simple Furniture. 1989.
Makers of Simple Furniture (Firm), and Gerald Summers. 1935. [Furniture trade catalogue]. [London?]: [Makers of Simple Furniture?].
Shone, Richard. "John Piper and Other Exhibitions. London and Norwich." The Burlington Magazine 126, no. 972 (1984): 173–75.
Phillips Son & Neale (London, England). 2000. Modernism & post-war design: including a collection of Gerald Summers furniture.

1899 births
1967 deaths
People educated at Eltham College
People from Alexandria
British furniture designers